Jürgen Ciezki (born 27 May 1952) is a German weightlifter. He competed in the men's heavyweight event at the 1976 Summer Olympics.

References

External links
 

1952 births
Living people
German male weightlifters
Olympic weightlifters of East Germany
Weightlifters at the 1976 Summer Olympics
Sportspeople from Schwerin
World Weightlifting Championships medalists
20th-century German people